Delias agostina, the yellow Jezebel is a medium-sized butterfly of the family Pieridae, that is, the yellows and whites.

See also
List of butterflies of India
List of butterflies of India (Pieridae)

References
 

agostina
Butterflies of Asia
Butterflies of Indochina
Butterflies described in 1852